Black Dutch may refer to:

 Black Dutch (genealogy)
 Afro-Dutch